Bocce was an electronic rock band from Waterloo, Ontario, Canada.

Biography
Mike Bond and Ben Ong formed the band in 2005, and added Tony Salomone and Nik Must. Bocce toured throughout Canada and played several music festivals including Pop Montreal, Hillside Inside, LOLA and Canadian Music Week. 

Their first EP, Hi Birdbear / Can't Reason Do It?, was released in 2006 to positive reviews and reached #9 on Earshot!'s Canadian campus and community radio charts. 

Bocce released a limited edition EP, …Should Be an Olympic Sport, in 2008 and remixed several Canadian artists including You Say Party! We Say Die!'s "Poison" and Slow Hand Motem's "Mathemagical" in the year following. In Spring 2010, Bocce released their first full-length album, Disambiguation, both as a physical disc and as a Pay what you can digital download. In 2012, they released the album Future 1.0.

Mike Bond has been with the band Loviator since 2010. Bocce's social media accounts have been inactive since 2016.

Members
Mike Bond (Drums)
Ben Ong (Synthesizer, Omnichord)
Tony Salomone (Vocals, Synthesizer)
Nik Must (Synthesizer, Piano)

Discography

Albums
 Disambiguation (album) (2010)
 Future 1.0 (2012)

EPs
 Hi Birdbear / Can't Reason Do It? (2006), Independent
 …Should Be an Olympic Sport (2008)

Contributions
 Friends in Bellwoods II (2009): "Inspiration"
 You Say Party! We Say Die! - Remik's Cube (2009): "Poison"
 Slow Hand Motem - Mathemagical (2009): "Mathemagical"

References

External links

Musical groups from the Regional Municipality of Waterloo
Canadian electronic music groups
Musical groups established in 2005
2005 establishments in Ontario